Antonio Róbinson Saldías González, also known as Don Antonio de Petrel (born 6 May 1951) is a Chilean researcher and writer. He studied philosophy at the University of Concepción.

Works 
In 1990, Saldías published the book Pichilemu, Mis Fuentes de Información. Prof. Cesar Caviedes, at the Handbook of Latin American Studies of the Library of Congress, notes: "a rather insignificant place on the coast of central Chile is "embellished" in the prose of this local writer".

Three years later, he published Litueche, antes El Rosario; in 1996, published the anthology Pichilemu, Canto de Puetas, that included popular poems by Pichileminian authors such as Antonio Álvarez Gaete, Gerardo Caroca Tobar, Raimundo León Morales, Miguel Becerra Pavez, Pedro Reyes González, Hugo González Urzúa and himself; and Franciscanos en Litueche in December 2004.

Saldías is a collaborator of El Marino.

References 

1951 births
Living people
People from Pichilemu
University of Concepción alumni
People from Santiago
20th-century Chilean historians
20th-century Chilean male writers
21st-century Chilean historians
21st-century Chilean male writers
20th-century Chilean poets
Chilean male poets